Another Stoney Evening is the sixth  album by the duo of David Crosby and Graham Nash, issued in 1998 on Grateful Dead Records, catalog GDCD 4057. It had been recorded at the Dorothy Chandler Pavilion in Los Angeles, California more than 26 years prior to its release.

Background
After the tour of Crosby, Stills, Nash & Young that ended in July 1970, the quartet broke up amidst some tension. All four members then pursued solo careers, each releasing an album within the next year. Nash and Crosby had developed a symbiotic musical relationship and so decided to undertake a tour as a duo during the autumn of 1971. They opted to go out without any backing band, playing theaters in what would later be termed an "unplugged" format. They were so pleased with the results that they recorded their first duo album in the spring of 1972.

The repertoire for this Crosby and Nash tour consisted of mostly previously released songs, some of which had appeared on Crosby and Nash's respective 1971 solo albums If I Could Only Remember My Name and Songs for Beginners. Four new songs would end up on the 1972 debut Crosby and Nash album: "Southbound Train"; "Where Will I Be?"; "Strangers Room"; and "Immigration Man." The title for the album comes from a bootleg of the period entitled A Very Stoney Evening, from a show on the tour mistakenly attributed to the evening of this recording.

Track listing

Personnel
 David Crosby — vocal, guitar
 Graham Nash — vocal, guitar, piano

Additional personnel
 Stephen Barncard — producer
 Bill Halverson — recording engineer
 Steve Silberman — liner notes

References

External links
 Crosby & Nash

Crosby & Nash live albums
Albums produced by Stephen Barncard
1998 live albums
Arista Records live albums
Grateful Dead Records live albums